Dexter Township is a civil township of Washtenaw County in the U.S. state of Michigan. The population was 6,042 at the 2010 census. The city of Dexter is located to the southeast but does not border the township, and the two are administered autonomously.

Communities
Dover was settled along the Huron River in 1833 and was given a post office named Base Lake on August 30, 1849. It was also referred to as Dover Mills. In 1882, the Birkett Manufacturing Company established in Dover, and the community's name and post office changed to Birkett on March 29, 1882. The post office closed on October 14, 1893.  
The community also lends its name to the Hudson Mills Metropark. Hudson Mills is a designated Michigan State Historic Site.
 North Lake is a historic settlement that existed within the township along the lake of the same name.  A post office under the name Louisville opened on January 21, 1835 and was renamed North Lake on April 18, 1836.  The post office closed on May 26, 1847.
 Silver Lake is a former settlement within the township.  A rural post office operated here from August 15, 1843 until September 3, 1856.  It was located along the lake of the same name, which is now part of Pinckney State Recreation Area.
 Sterling is a historic settlement that was established en route between Ann Arbor and Ionia and received a post office on January 15, 1836.  The post office operated until August 12, 1845.

Geography

The township contains numerous lakes, and the Huron River flows along the eastern border.  Portions of Pinckney State Recreation Area and Hudson Mills Metropark are within the township.  The Border-to-Border Trail runs through the township.

Demographics
As of the census of 2000, there were 5,248 people, 1,863 households, and 1,488 families residing in the township. The racial makeup of the township was 97.52% White, 0.38% African American, 0.29% Native American, 0.61% Asian, 0.06% Pacific Islander, 0.08% from other races, and 1.07% from two or more races. Hispanic or Latino of any race were 1.03% of the population.

There were 1,863 households, out of which 40.6% had children under the age of 18 living with them, 71.8% were married couples living together, 5.3% had a female householder with no husband present, and 20.1% were non-families. 16.1% of all households were made up of individuals, and 5.3% had someone living alone who was 65 years of age or older.  The average household size was 2.80 and the average family size was 3.16.

In the township the population was spread out, with 28.5% under the age of 18, 5.6% from 18 to 24, 28.5% from 25 to 44, 29.2% from 45 to 64, and 8.3% who were 65 years of age or older.  The median age was 38 years. For every 100 females, there were 102.3 males.  For every 100 females age 18 and over, there were 100.7 males.

The median income for a household in the township was $75,085, and the median income for a family was $81,510. Males had a median income of $57,596 versus $34,219 for females. The per capita income for the township was $30,164.  About 0.8% of families and 1.8% of the population were below the poverty line, including 0.9% of those under age 18 and 2.3% of those age 65 or over.

Education
Dexter Township is served by three public school districts.  The majority of the township is served by Dexter Community School District in the nearby city of Dexter.  The western portion of the township is served by Chelsea School District in Chelsea.  A very small northern portion of the township is served by Pinckney Community Schools to the north in Livingston County.

Images

References

Sources

External links

Dexter Township official website

Populated places established in 1827
Townships in Washtenaw County, Michigan
1827 establishments in Michigan Territory
Townships in Michigan